PA-99-N2 is a microlensing event detected in the direction of the Andromeda Galaxy in 1999.

Explanations 

One possibility for the event is that a star in the disk of M31 gravitationally lensed a red giant also in the disk. In this case the lens profile makes it likely that the star has a planet.

Possible exoplanet 
The possible exoplanet would have a mass of 6.34 Jupiter mass. If confirmed, it would be the first exoplanet found in another galaxy. A similar event was seen in 1996, when a team of astronomers discovered an anomalous fluctuation in the Twin Quasar's lightcurve that seemed to be caused by a planet approximately three Earth masses in size in the quasar's lensing galaxy YGKOW G1. (However, the results remain speculative because the chance alignment that led to its discovery will never happen again; if that exoplanet could be confirmed, it would be the most distant known planet, 4 billion ly away.)

References 

Andromeda (constellation)
Gravitational lensing
Extragalactic stars
Andromeda Galaxy